Marco Jhonfai Fabián de la Mora (born 21 July 1989) is a Mexican professional footballer who plays as an attacking midfielder for Liga MX club Mazatlán. He is an Olympic gold medalist.

Fabián is a graduate of C.D. Guadalajara's youth academy, and made his senior team debut during the 2007 Apertura. Fabián took part in the Copa Libertadores in 2010 as Guadalajara finished runners-up. He spent time on loan with Cruz Azul in 2014 before returning to Guadalajara.

Fabián represented Mexico in several youth categories before reaching a full cap with the senior team. He was in the initial roster for the 2011 Copa América, but was expelled from the team and suspended for six months along with six other players, for breaking disciplinary codes at their concentration hotel in Quito. In 2012, as a competitor of the Mexico U-23 national team, Fabián helped Mexico qualify to the 2012 Summer Olympics and win the 2012 Toulon Tournament, where he was the top scorer. Fabián was part of Mexico's roster who won the Olympic gold medal at the 2012 Summer Olympics in London after defeating Brazil in the final. He would also go on to participate in the 2011 and 2013 CONCACAF Gold Cup, the 2015 Copa América, the 2017 FIFA Confederations Cup, the 2014 and the 2018 FIFA World Cup.

Club career

Guadalajara
Fabián was recruited by Guadalajara, and spent ten years in the Chivas youth system, including appearances for their affiliate club Tapatío.

On 10 November 2007, Fabián made his first-team debut in a league match against Jaguares de Chiapas in the Apertura 2007 season under coach Efrain Flores, coming in as a substitute for Sergio Ávila in the 85th minute of the match. Fabián scored his first goal for Guadalajara in his second appearance, on 2 February 2008, in a 6–0 win over Morelia.

In the 2010 Copa Libertadores Finals, Fabián scored the first goal in a 3–2 defeat against Internacional.

On 15 October 2011, he scored the first hat-trick of his career against Estudiantes Tecos; Guadalajara went on to win the match 5–2.

Cruz Azul (loan)
On 12 December 2013, Fabián joined Cruz Azul on a two-year-long loan deal. Fabián made his Cruz Azul debut on 1 May 2014 against León, with the game ending in a 1–1 tie. On 15 February 2014, he scored a 92nd minute winning goal against Puebla. The goal was later nominated for the 2014 FIFA Puskás Award.

Return to Guadalajara
On 26 December 2014, after his loan deal expired, Cruz Azul opted not to exercise their purchase option due to Fabián's high expense. He subsequently returned to Guadalajara and was assigned the number 33 shirt, since his preferred number 10 had since been taken; 33 was the same kit number he used when he made his professional debut in 2007. In his return to the Omnilife Stadium, on 18 January, Fabián scored his first goal of the Clausura 2015 tournament against UNAM in a 2–1 home victory. On 21 February 2015, Fabián then scored in a 1–2 away victory against Cruz Azul at the Azul Stadium. On 17 May 2015, he scored a hat-trick against Atlas during the 2015 Clausura quarter-finals, where Guadalajara won the match 4–1.

Eintracht Frankfurt
On 18 December 2015, Guadalajara announced Fabián was sold to German Bundesliga side Eintracht Frankfurt for a transfer fee of US$4 million on a three-year contract. After completing his medical, Fabián was handed the number 10 jersey. He made his official debut coming on as a substitute for Haris Seferovic in the 45th minute in a home match against VfL Wolfsburg on 24 January 2016. He created the play that led to Alexander Meier's hat-trick that won the game 3–2.

He scored his first goal of the 2016–17 season—and his first Bundesliga goal—in a 2–1 win over Bayer Leverkusen on 17 September 2016. On 15 October, Fabián connected with his chest off a Timothy Chandler cross as Frankfurt held Bayern Munich to a 2–2 draw.

Philadelphia Union
On 8 February 2019 it was officially announced that Fabián had been transferred from Frankfurt to MLS team Philadelphia Union. Fabian signed a one-year deal with club options for the next two years. On March 2, Fabian made his MLS debut against Toronto FC, scoring his team's lone goal of the encounter, losing 1–3. On October 20, in a playoff match against New York Red Bulls, he entered the match at the 103rd minute and scored the winning goal of the match, leaving the result 4–3 and giving Philadelphia their first playoff win in team history.

On 20 November 2019, Philadelphia announced they had declined the option on Fabián's contract.

Al-Sadd
On 5 February 2020, he joined Qatar Stars League side Al-Sadd until the end of the season.

International career

Youth
Fabián was selected by coach Juan Carlos Chávez to participate in the 2009 CONCACAF U-20 Championship held in Trinidad and Tobago. He made his youth International debut 7 March 2009 against Costa Rica wearing the number 8 shirt. Fabián managed three appearances for Mexico during the tournament; Mexico placed last in their group, thus failing to qualify to the 2009 FIFA U-20 World Cup.

2012 Olympic Qualifying Tournament
In early 2012, Fabián was called up by coach Luis Fernando Tena to participate in the 2012 Olympic Qualifying Tournament. He made his debut 23 March 2012 against Trinidad and Tobago, scoring a hat-trick in a 7–1 win for Mexico. Fabián also went on to score in the semi-final match against Canada, winning the match 3–1. He then score from a long-range shot in the final match against Honduras, winning the match 2–1 and also the tournament, thus qualifying Mexico for the 2012 Summer Olympics. He finished the tournament as top goal scorer alongside his teammate Alan Pulido with five goals in five appearances.

2012 Toulon Tournament
Again Fabián was selected by coach Tena to dispute the 2012 Toulon Tournament in preparation for the Summer Olympics. Fabián debuted in the tournament with a hat-trick against Morocco. He went on to score a goal in a defeat against the host nation France, and scored a Brace against Belarus. Fabián also scored in the semi-final match against Netherlands, but could not score in the final against Turkey, which Mexico won 3–0. Fabián won the tournament's Top Scorer award after netting seven goals in five appearances during the tournament. He tied England's Alan Shearer as the all-time Toulon Tournament top scorer, with seven goals.

2012 Summer Olympics
Fabián made the final list for those players participating in the 2012 London Olympics. He made his debut in Mexico's first match of the tournament 2012 as a starter against South Korea, a game that ended 0–0. Fabián showed great skill and workmanship throughout the group stage match and helped Mexico reach the knockoff round. During the semi-final match against Japan, he proved vital by scoring in the 31st minute of the match to tie the game and later to win it 3–1, securing Mexico's progression to the final against Brazil. During the final, he almost netted an over-head bicycle kick goal but it struck the post, though he did provide an assist for Oribe Peralta's second goal of the match. Mexico would win the match 2–1 and thus win the Olympic goal medal. He played the entire tournament as Mexico's second striker behind Peralta, and created a successful offensive deplete with him throughout the tournament. He finished the tournament with one goal from six matches, all as a starter. As a result, he became the top goal scorer for Mexico at the under-23 level, with 15 goals.

Senior
Fabián made his senior national team debut against Venezuela in a 3–1 win on 25 January 2012.

2011 Gold Cup
During the Gold Cup 2011, Fabián was named as one of the replacements for the five players who tested positive for clenbuterol, but would only be called to join them in an emergency, because he was already in concentration with the under-22 squad in preparation for the Copa América.

2011 Copa America
In 2011, Marco was called up by Luis Fernando Tena to form part of the "unofficial national team" composed entirely of players under the age of 22 to compete in the 2011 Copa América. He started most of the preparation games and scored a few goals before being suspended for six months, along with seven more players, for breaking disciplinary codes at their concentration hotel in Quito.

2013 Gold Cup
Fabián played his first major tournament with the senior national team at the 2013 Gold Cup. He made his debut against Panama. He finished the tournament with three goals and three assists.

2014 FIFA World Cup
On 8 May 2014, Fabián was included in the final 23-man roster participating in the 2014 FIFA World Cup in Brazil. He debuted in a World Cup by coming on as a substitute in the first match against Cameroon in the 69th minute for Andrés Guardado. In Mexico's second match, against Brazil, he came on in the 76th minute for Héctor Herrera. He also played in the third match against Croatia coming on as a substitute in the 84th minute, once again for Andrés Guardado.

2017 Confederations Cup
In his first Confederations Cup call up, Fabián only played twice. He was a starter in the second match in the group stage against New Zealand. In the semi-final game against Germany, he was subbed in for Giovani dos Santos on the 62nd minute. He went on to score Mexico's only goal against Germany on the 89th minute, making the score 3–1. Mexico would  go on to lose the match 4–1. His goal against Germany was voted as Hyundai Goal of the Tournament.

2018 World Cup
In May 2018, Fabián was named in Mexico's preliminary 28-man squad for the World Cup, and in June, was ultimately included in the final 23-man roster. He would only appear in Mexico's final group stage match against Sweden, substituted in at the 67th minute for Jesús Gallardo in a 3–0 loss.

Style of play
ESPN described him as, "His balance and poise on the ball is impeccable [...]. Equally adept on either foot, he can play on either wing or as an attacking midfielder and breezes past defenders as if they are not there. Fabián also has that knack of scoring spectacular goals that help win fans over."

According to a poll held by German sports magazine Kicker, he was voted the third best offensive midfielder in the Bundesliga, placing him in the "international class" of the magazine's Rangliste des deutschen Fussballs (Ranking of German football) for the Winter of 2016–17.

Personal life
Fabián helped fund a football academy Guadalajara, Mexico. It provides football coaching, nutritional and psychological advice to participants under the direct supervision of Fabián himself. One graduate of the program reportedly signed with Brazilian club Santos FC in 2016. Fabián is also a fan of the baseball team Charros de Jalisco, and is a close friend to Javier Hernández.

Media
He appeared on the Mexican front cover of FIFA 16 along with Lionel Messi.

Career statistics

International

International goals
Scores and results list Mexico's goal tally first.

Honours
Guadalajara
Copa MX: Apertura 2015
InterLiga: 2009

Cruz Azul
CONCACAF Champions League: 2013–14

Eintracht Frankfurt
DFB-Pokal: 2017–18

Mexico U23
CONCACAF Olympic Qualifying Championship: 2012
Toulon Tournament: 2012
Olympic Gold Medal: 2012

Mexico
CONCACAF Gold Cup: 2011

Individual
CONCACAF Olympic Qualifying Championship Top Scorer (Shared): 2012
Toulon Tournament Golden Boot: 2012
FIFA Confederations Cup Goal of the Tournament: 2017

References

External links

 
 
 
 
 

1989 births
Living people
C.D. Guadalajara footballers
Eintracht Frankfurt players
Liga MX players
Bundesliga players
2011 CONCACAF Gold Cup players
2013 CONCACAF Gold Cup players
2014 FIFA World Cup players
2015 Copa América players
2017 FIFA Confederations Cup players
CONCACAF Gold Cup-winning players
Olympic footballers of Mexico
Footballers at the 2012 Summer Olympics
Olympic gold medalists for Mexico
Olympic medalists in football
Mexico youth international footballers
Mexico international footballers
Expatriate footballers in Germany
Expatriate soccer players in the United States
Expatriate footballers in Qatar
Mexican expatriate sportspeople in the United States
Mexican expatriate sportspeople in Germany
Medalists at the 2012 Summer Olympics
Cruz Azul footballers
Footballers from Guadalajara, Jalisco
Association football midfielders
Mexican footballers
2018 FIFA World Cup players
Philadelphia Union players
Designated Players (MLS)
Al Sadd SC players
Major League Soccer players
Qatar Stars League players